Tough Baby is the second studio album by Canadian musical collective, Crack Cloud, released on September 16, 2022 via the group's independent imprint, Crack Cloud Media Studio and Meat Machine Records. The album was preceded by three singles, "Please Yourself", "Tough Baby" and "Costly Engineered Illusion" released May 11, July 8, and September 1. 2022, respectively.

Promotion and release
On April 1, 2022, Crack Cloud released a teaser trailer via social media, featuring a brief cameo by Canadian singer/songwriter, Mac Demarco as a clapper loader, alongside members of the collective on a soundstage as a film crew that documenting a teenage girl and a group of patients in hospital gowns watching a mysterious television program in a partially-constructed set decorated and made to appear like the girl's bedroom. 

The trailer was later revealed to be the music video for the album's first single, "Please Yourself" which released May 11, 2022, alongside the album's announcement. On July 6, 2022, the group released the album's self-titled second single and music video, consisting of a narrative focused around a young, adolescent girl who daydreams of living amongst a group of Troglodytes (also portrayed by members of the collective). 

The album's third single, Costly Engineered Illusion was released September 1. 2022.

Track listing

Personnel 
 Zack Rain Hope Choy – lead vocals, drums, percussion, violin, mellotron, production, synthesizer, keyboards, design, album concept, writing, composition, lyrics, processing, arrangements, additional mixing  
 Nicolas Dirksen – strings, organ, guitar, synths, drum machine, bass, vocals, additional engineering, additional mixing, additional lyrics 
 Eve Adams – vocals
 Jesse Atkey – saxophone
 Sukhi Aulakh –  voice 
 Will Hael Choy –  guitar, vocals
 Danny Choy –  voice , masks (featured on album cover)
 Bryce Cloghesy – saxophone, guitar, synths, vocals
 Mackenzie Cruse – vocals, graphic design 
 Justin Defries – percussion
 Caton Diab – trumpet, bowed guitar, flute
 Aleem Khan – piano, vocals
 Jouvaughan Meek –  voice
 Garnet Aroynk Muhammmed – guitar, bass,, vocals
 Sage Aroynk Muhammmed – percussion, vocals
 Daniel Robertson – keys, synths, mellotron, guitar, vocals
 Mohammad Ali Sharar – guitar, vocals, graphic design, album concept
 Camryn Sproule – percussion, vocals 

Additional musicians
 Tabitha Brasso-Ernst – vocals 
 Greta Das – trumpet
 Kira Fondse – vocals 
 Alison Gorman – flugelhorn
 Jacob Grammit – vocals
 Brian Harding – trombone
 Marc Lindy – tuba
 Steve Maddock  – vocals
 Carman J. Price – vocals
 Taka Shimojima – vocals
 Lucy Smith – vocals
 Risa Takahashi – vocals

Technical 
 John Paul Stewart – engineering, additional mixing, processing, synths, guitar, bass, vocals
 Be Hussey – additional engineering
 Paul Corley – mixing
 Lisa Choy – cover model
 Heba Kadry – mastering
 Fahim Kassam – cover photography
 Amy Lowe – diorama (featured on album insert)
 Shilo Preshyon – additional engineering
 Nathan Salon – additional mixing
 Curtis Windover – album layout

References

2022 albums